WellSpan Health is a large integrated health care system located in South-Central Pennsylvania.  Headquartered in York, Pennsylvania, WellSpan Health includes WellSpan York Hospital, WellSpan Gettysburg Hospital, WellSpan Ephrata Community Hospital, WellSpan Surgery & Rehabilitation Hospital, WellSpan Medical Group, WellSpan VNA Home Care, WellSpan Good Samaritan Hospital, WellSpan Philhaven, WellSpan Chambersburg Hospital, WellSpan Waynesboro Hospital, Apple Hill Surgical Center, WellSpan Medical Equipment, and several other health care provider entities in south central Pennsylvania and northern Maryland. WellSpan also provides EMS services for several municipalities in Franklin County, York County, and Lancaster County as WellSpan EMS.

WellSpan York Hospital offers many graduate medical educational programs, including residencies sponsored in the fields of Internal Medicine, General Surgery, Emergency Medicine, Obstetrics and Gynecology, Dentistry, Orthopedic Surgery, Sports Medicine, Osteopathic Medicine and Family Medicine.  WellSpan York Hospital also hosts allied health certification programs for nurse anesthetists, radiology, phlebotomy, medical laboratory science and respiratory care.

Mission statement

Working as one to improve health through exceptional care for all, lifelong wellness and healthy communities.

Key Statistics 
 WellSpan Health provides more than $126 million each year in charitable, uncompensated care.
 Employs more than 19,000 employees across south central Pennsylvania.
 WellSpan Medical Group includes more than 1,200 primary care and specialty physicians and advanced practice clinicians.
 Includes more than 130 outpatient patient care locations that offer services such as diagnostic imaging, laboratory, rehabilitation, primary care, walk-in health care, durable medical equipment and other specialty services.
 Includes a regional home care organization (WellSpan VNA Home Care).

History 
In December 1879, York, PA businessman Samuel Small gathered others in the community to discuss the idea of establishing a local hospital to support York's growing population needs and manufacturing interests. He offered to donate the land on which the hospital would be built, and on January 14, 1880 the letters of incorporation were filed with the Court of Common Pleas of York County to build The York Hospital and Dispensary. The  three-story building was constructed at the corner of West College Ave. and  Church Alley. An annual report for the year 1896 shows that a total of 1,922 cases were treated (1,756 in the dispensary and 166 as inpatients).

York Hospital and Dispensary later shortened its name to York Hospital and then York Health Network. In 1999, Gettysburg Hospital became the second hospital in York Health Network.

In 2000, York Health Network joined WellSpan Health.

Recent mergers and affiliations include:
 Ephrata Community Hospital, Ephrata, PA, on Oct. 1, 2013.
 Good Samaritan Health System, Lebanon, PA, on July 1, 2015.
 Philhaven, the 14th largest mental health provider in the United States, on Jan. 1, 2016

WellSpan Leadership Team

 Roxanna L. Gapstur, Ph.D, R.N., president and chief executive officer
 Anthony Aquilina, MD, executive vice president, chief physician executive
 John M. Porter Jr., executive vice president and chief operating officer
 R. Hal Baker, MD, senior vice president, clinical improvement, and chief information officer
 Robert J. Batory, senior vice president and chief human resources officer
 P. Geoffrey Nicholson,Jr., MD, senior vice president, population health
 Thomas R. Harlow, senior vice president, WellSpan Health/president, WellSpan Good Samaritan Hospital
 Philip D. Hess, senior vice president, WellSpan Health/president, WellSpan Philhaven
 Jane E. Hyde, senior vice president, WellSpan Health/president, WellSpan Gettysburg Hospital
 Karen Jones, MD, senior vice president, WellSpan Health/president, WellSpan Medical Group
 Glen D. Moffett, Esq., senior vice president and general counsel
 Keith D. Noll, senior vice president, WellSpan Health/president, WellSpan York Hospital
 Michael F. O'Connor, senior vice president and chief financial officer
 Maria L. Royce, senior vice president, strategy and market development; chief strategy officer
 Carrie Willetts, senior vice president, WellSpan Health/president, WellSpan Ephrata Community Hospital
 Barbara A. Yarrish, RN, senior vice president, post-acute services, WellSpan Health/president, WellSpan Surgery & Rehabilitation Hospital

References

External links
WellSpan Health
WellSpan Ephrata Community Hospital
WellSpan Gettysburg Hospital
WellSpan York Hospital
WellSpan Surgery & Rehabilitation Hospital
WellSpan Medical Group
WellSpan VNA Home Care
WellSpan Philhaven

Medical and health organizations based in Pennsylvania
Non-profit organizations based in Pennsylvania
Trauma centers
York, Pennsylvania